"Living with the Law" is a song recorded by American singer-songwriter and guitarist, Chris Whitley. It was the first single to be released from his 1991 début album, Living with the Law, and became a hit single in the United States, rising to No. 28 on the Billboard Mainstream Rock chart in 1991.

Music video
The music video (directed by Rocky Schenck) features Whitley singing and playing his 1931 National Triolian in a variety of indoor and outdoor urban environments.

Cover versions
Michael Shrieve covered the song on his album, Fascination (2001). The song has also been recorded by Robert Caruso.

References

1991 singles
Music videos directed by Rocky Schenck
Columbia Records singles
1991 songs